Abolition Row is a neighborhood in New Bedford, Massachusetts. A number of the families that founded the town of New Bedford lived on Sixth and Seventh Streets and were active members of the Abolition movement in New Bedford. They also represent the whaling industry employers who employed a diverse workforce. It is located near the New Bedford Whaling National Historical Park.

Overview
The one-square-mile neighborhood was the home to white and black abolitionists, including former slaves. Located on Seventh Street, abolitionists Nathan and Mary Johnson lived among their business partners and other anti-slavery advocates. Former slaves, Lewis Temple and Frederick Douglass lived in Abolition Row. Although slavery was abolished in 1783, there were laws (like the Fugitive Slave Act of 1850) that allowed slaveholders to capture fugitive slaves and return them to slavery. New Bedford, however, had a network of abolitionists that no former slaves would be reclaimed. The neighborhood's houses are of Federal, Greek Revival, Gothic Revival and early Italian architecture.

Abolition Row Park
Abolition Row Park, developed by the New Bedford Historical Society, is located at Seventh and Spring Streets, near downtown New Bedford. It is in the Seaport Cultural District, where the Friends Meeting House (1820) and Nathan and Polly Johnson properties (1810) are located. The Johnson House was an Underground Railroad station and the first residence of Frederick Douglass and Anna Murray-Douglass. Both buildings are on the National Register of Historic Places and are important for their importance during the days of the Underground Railroad and the Anti-slavery movement in New Bedford.

By late 2018, an archaeological dig was conducted at the site of the Abolition Row Park by the Plymouth Archaeological Rediscovery Project.

In 2017, a ground-breaking was conducted for the park, which will have a statue of abolitionist Frederick Douglass, a gazebo, a community garden, a border of Cherry trees, and markers about the historical significance of the Abolition Row area. In June 2019, the Mass Cultural Council (Cultural Facilities Fund) awarded The New Bedford Historical Society  a grant of $180,000 to fund the memorial statue of Frederick Douglass and the development of the park. This is in addition to a grant from Community Preservation Act of New Bedford for $125,000 and other grants from U.S. Conference of Mayors Foundation, the Demoulas Foundation, and the Island Foundation. The grants meet the funding needed by The New Bedford Historical Society and the City of New Bedford. Representative Antonio F.D. Cabral and Senator Mark Montigny provided support for the Abolition Row Project. The park is scheduled to be completed in the summer of 2020.

Exhibit
The University of Massachusetts Dartmouth Art Gallery held an exhibit from November 2018 through January 2019 of Abolition Row entitled "Black Spaces Matter: Celebrating New Bedford's Abolition Row." It included documentary films, virtual-reality tours of the neighborhood, historic photographs and maps, illustrations, and 3-D print models.

References

External links
 Abolition Row Park, Facebook

Abolitionism in the United States
New Bedford, Massachusetts